Centropyxidae is a family of Amoebozoa.

References 

 Thomas Cavalier-Smith, Ema E.-Y. Chao, Brian Oates, Molecular phylogeny of Amoebozoa and the evolutionary significance of the unikont Phalansterium, Europ. J. Protistol. 40, 21-48 (2004).

External links 
 
 

Amoebozoa families
Tubulinea